Malik Djibril (born 30 August 2003) is a Togolese footballer who plays as a midfielder for Italian  club Fidelis Andria, on loan from Vicenza.

Club career
Djibril made his Serie B debut for Vicenza on 2 March 2022 in a game against Reggina.

On 1 September 2022, Djibril was loaned by Fidelis Andria in Serie C.

International career
Djibril was called up to the Togo national team in March 2022. He did not make his debut for his nation at that time.

References

External links
 

2003 births
Living people
Togolese footballers
Association football midfielders
L.R. Vicenza players
S.S. Fidelis Andria 1928 players
Serie B players
Serie C players
Togolese expatriate footballers
Togolese expatriate sportspeople in Italy
Expatriate footballers in Italy